This is a list of engines and weapons used on Japanese tanks during World War II.

Tank engines

Mitsubishi/Ishikawajima In6 air-cooled 6-cylinder gasoline engine 45(petrol) PS/1600 rpm  of 45 hp (34 kW)
Mitsubishi A6120VD-cylinder air-cooled petrol diesel of 120 hp (90 kW)
Mitsubishi Diesel Engine 120 PS 
Mitsubishi Petrol Engine 35 PS/2500 rpm 
Mitsubishi Gasoline Engine 290 PS/1600 rpm 
Mitsubishi Gasoline Engine 50 PS/2400 rpm 
Mitsubishi Diesel Engine 65 PS/2300 rpm 
Mitsubishi air-cooled 4-cyl. petrol of 32 hp (24 kW)
Ikegai air-cooled 4-cylinder diesel  of 48 hp (36 kW)
Mitsubishi NVD 6120 air-cooled diesel engine 120 PS/1800 rpm of 120 hp (89 kW) 
Mitsubishi Type 97 V-12 21.7 L diesel engine 170 PS/2000 rpm of 170 hp (130 kW)
Mitsubishi air-cooled 6-cylinder dieselo of 115 hp (86 kW)
Mitsubishi Type 100 air-cooled V-12 diesel engine 130 PS/2100 rpm of 130 hp (97 kW)
Mitsubishi Type 100 air-cooled V-12 diesel (Petrol)of 170 hp
Mitsubishi water-cooled 6cyl gasoline/diesel engine 115 PS/1800 rpm of 115 hp
Mitsubishi Type 100 air-cooled V-12 diesel engine 240 PS/2000 rpm  of 240 hp (179 kW)
Mitsubishi Type 4 V12 Diesel Engine 400 PS/1800 rpm  with supercharger of 400 hp
(BMW) Kawasaki Ha-9 V12 Gasoline Engine PS/1500 rpm of 550 hp
Engine  Straight 6 Diesel of 145 hp
Electric Motor 2HP (Ko) and 4HP (Otsu)

Armored car engines
diesel engine (Petrol) 134 PS/2000 rpm of 134 hp
diesel engine (petrol) 65 PS/2300 rpm of 65 hp
air-cooled engine V8 gasoline of 130 hp

Tank and armored car armament

Tank guns

Type 90
Type 97
Type 94
Type 98
Type 100
Type 1
Type 99
Type 3
Type 5

Tank and armored car machine guns
Type 91
Type 97

Tank and armored vehicle radio communicators
Radio set Type 94/Mk 4 Otsu, (Year 1934)
Radio set Type 94/Mk 4 Hei, (Year 1934)
Radio set Type 96/Mk 2 Bo, (Year 1941)
Radio set Type 96/Mk 4 Bo, (Year 1941)
Radio set Type 3 Ko, (Year 1943)
Radio set Type 3 Otsu, (Year 1943)
Radio set Type Hei, (Year 1943)

References

World War II tanks of Japan
History of the tank